City Thameslink is a central London railway station within the City of London, with entrances on Ludgate Hill and Holborn Viaduct.

The station opened in 1990 to replace  Holborn Viaduct railway station. It was part of the Thameslink project that re-opened the Snow Hill Tunnel to provide a continuous north–south route across London. Originally named St. Paul's Thameslink, it was renamed City Thameslink the following year to avoid confusion with the nearby St Paul's tube station on the Central line. The station was refurbished in 2010–11 to increase capacity, and the timetable was revised in 2018 with the introduction of automatic signalling.

Name and location 

The station is near the western edge of the City of London, close to its border with the City of Westminster. It has two entrances, one on Ludgate Hill and another on Holborn Viaduct, both of which access the two platforms. A planned Tube station in the immediate area, to be named , was ultimately never built.

Although City Thameslink is a through-station, for ticketing purposes it is classed as a London terminus for Thameslink services to and from the south. The name has come in for criticism as being uninspiring.

Several London Buses routes pass the station, 8; 25; 46; 521 and night routes N8 and N25.

History

Opening 
The Thameslink line opened in 1988 after the Snow Hill tunnel, closed to passengers since 1916, was re-opened to provide a through route to Farringdon and King's Cross from South London. Initially, trains used the approach viaduct for the now-closed  station. The new service was an immediate financial success, and it was decided to redevelop the Holborn Viaduct site with a new station and business complex. The work was part-financed by the London property developer Rosehaugh Stanhope.

City Thameslink was built to replace Holborn Viaduct station. The total cost was estimated at between £360 and £450 million. Because of a proposed routing for the second phase of the Jubilee line through the area, part of the station was built to allow for a future interchange.

Holborn Viaduct closed on 26 January 1990. All Thameslink services were suspended for 17 days the following  May so that demolition work could be carried out.

The station was opened by British Rail on 29 May 1990 as St. Paul's Thameslink, and was renamed to City Thameslink on 30 September 1991 to avoid confusion with the  Central line station on the London Underground, which is several hundred yards to the east, to the north of St Paul's Cathedral. It was the first mainline station built in central London in almost 100 years. The station was designed by SAS International, who designed the original walls and panelling.

In conjunction with construction of the new station, the area around the old Holborn Viaduct and Ludgate Hill stations was redeveloped and an old bridge across Ludgate Hill was removed. In 1992, following the demolition, an additional service tunnel was constructed connecting City Thameslink to Farringdon.

When the Thameslink franchise was awarded to First Capital Connect (FCC) in 2006, the Thameslink service was re-branded but City Thameslink was not renamed. By late 2010, FCC had reverted to the Thameslink name.

Recent events 
As part of the Thameslink Programme, an upgrade of City Thameslink station was completed in 2010. The upgrade was important because the closure of Blackfriars later in the year would lead to increased footfall. The platforms were made ready for future 12-carriage trains, and the passenger information system improved. New lighting, ticket gates and CCTV cameras were installed, and the service announcement system was upgraded to provide more accurate train times. SAS retrofitted the station interior, as they had done for the original 1990 construction, with enamel wall panels that fitted the original design specification.

In a 2014 report, London TravelWatch suggested an underground passageway linking City Thameslink to St Paul's tube station to provide an interchange with the Central line that would benefit passengers travelling from the Central line catchment to Gatwick and Luton Airports.

In 2018, Govia Thameslink Railway announced a major timetable change, which was implemented that May. The signalling was upgraded to support automatic train operation through the station, along with the rest of the core Thameslink route, and British Rail Class 700 trains were introduced into the service.

Services 
City Thameslink is served by trains operated by Thameslink on the Thameslink Route which run Monday-Saturday only with the station being closed on Sundays. Train services are operated using Class 700 Desiro City EMUs.

The typical off-peak service in trains per hour is:
 4 tph to  via 
 2 tph to  via  and Gatwick Airport
 2 tph to Three Bridges via Redhill 
 2 tph to  via 
 2 tph to  via Stevenage 

City Thameslink serves as the lost property office of the Thameslink line. A fee is charged for retrieving property.

Connections 
London Buses routes 8, 11, 15, 17, 25, 26, 40, 46, 56, 63, 76, 242, 341, 521 and night routes N8, N11, N15, N21, N25, N26, N63, N89, N199, N242, N550 and N551 serve the station.

References 
Citations

Sources

Further reading

External links 

Railway stations in the City of London
DfT Category C1 stations
Railway stations in Great Britain opened in 1990
Railway stations opened by British Rail
Railway stations located underground in the United Kingdom
Railway stations served by Govia Thameslink Railway
Railway termini in London
London station group